The Beyerlein House is a historic house at 412 W. 14th St. in Little Rock, Arkansas, USA. It is a 1½-story wood-frame structure, with a clipped-gable roof and a combination of weatherboard siding on the first floor, and half-timbered stucco in the gables. A porch projects from the right side of the front, with a low brick balcony and brick piers supporting squat posts, that support the gabled roof.  The building's gables have exposed rafter tails in the Craftsman style. The house was built in 1917 to a design by Charles L. Thompson.

The house was listed on the National Register of Historic Places in 1982 for its architecture. It is also included as a contributing building in a boundary increase of the Governor's Mansion Historic District, which is also listed on the National Register.

References

American Craftsman architecture in Arkansas
Bungalow architecture in Arkansas
Houses on the National Register of Historic Places in Arkansas
Houses completed in 1917
Houses in Little Rock, Arkansas
National Register of Historic Places in Little Rock, Arkansas
Historic district contributing properties in Arkansas